The 2019 African Games men's football tournament was the 12th edition of the African Games men's football tournament. The men's football tournament was held as part of the 2019 African Games between 16–30 August 2019. Under-20 national teams took part in the tournament.

Teams

Initially, qualification for the African Games tournament was shared with that of the 2019 Africa U-23 Cup of Nations. Following the delay of the third round of qualification from June to September 2019 (after the African Games vent), CAF selected representative teams from nations that had participated in the 2019 Africa U-20 Cup of Nations.

 (hosts)

Officials

Referees
 André Kolissala
 Juste Kokolo
 Mohamed Adel
 Jerry Yekeh
 Babacar Sarr
 Jalal Jayed
 Adil Zourak
 Quadri Adebimpe
 Omar Artan
 Eugene Mdluli
 Ring Malong
 Komlanvi Aklassou

Assistant Referees

 Rachid Waiss
 Dalmacio Obono
 Kwasi Brobbey
 Hicham Ait Abbou
 Zakaria Brinsi
 Hamza Naciri
 Yahya Nouali
 Efosa Celestine
 Ibrahim Bah
 Meck Zulu
 Edgar Rumeck

Venues

Group stage

Group A

Group B

Knockout stage

Bracket

Semi-finals

Third place

Final

Goalscorers

See also
Football at the 2019 African Games – Women's tournament

Notes

References

Men's
African Games, Men's